HC Avtomobilist are a professional ice hockey team based in Yekaterinburg, Sverdlovsk Oblast, Russia. They replaced Khimik Voskresensk in the Kontinental Hockey League in 2009.

History
Founded in 2006, the team took its name from an older Yekaterinburg ice hockey club called Avtomobilist that used to play in the Soviet championship and later the International Hockey League.

Season-by-season record
Note: GP = Games played, W = Wins, L = Losses, OTW = Overtime/shootout wins, OTL = Overtime/shootout losses, Pts = Points, GF = Goals for, GA = Goals against

Players and personnel

Current roster

Team captains

 Alexander Gulyavtsev, 2009–11
 Sergei Gusev, 2012–14
 Alexei Simakov, 2014–16
 Petr Koukal, 2016–17
 Alexei Mikhnov, 2017–18
 Nikita Tryamkin, 2018
 Nigel Dawes, 2018–20
 Pavel Datsyuk, 2020–21
 Nikita Tryamkin, 2021–22
 Sergei Shirokov, 2022–

Head coaches

 Leonid Kiselyov, 2006
 Vitali Krayov, 2006–07
 Mikhail Malko, 2007
 Sergei Shepelev, 2007–08
 Miskhat Fakhrutdinov, 2008–09
 Marek Sykora, 2009–10
 Evgeni Popikhin, 2010
 Evgeni Mukhin, 2010–11
 Ilya Byakin, 2011
 Andrei Martemyanov, 2011–12
 Andrei Shayanov, 2012
 Igor Ulanov, 2012–13
 Anatoly Emelin, 2013–15
 Andrei Razin, 2015–16
 Vladimir Krikunov, 2016–18
 Andrei Martemyanov, 2018–20
 Bill Peters, 2020–2021
 Nikolai Zavarukhin, 2021–

Franchise leaders

All-time KHL scoring leaders 

These are the top-ten point-scorers in franchise history. Figures are updated after each completed KHL regular season.

Note: Pos = Position; GP = Games played; G = Goals; A = Assists; Pts = Points; P/G = Points per game;  = current Avtomobilist player

References

External links
  

 
Ice hockey teams in Russia
Kontinental Hockey League teams
Sports clubs in Yekaterinburg
Ice hockey clubs established in 2006
2006 establishments in Russia